Bergen an der Dumme is a municipality in the district of Lüchow-Dannenberg, in Lower Saxony, Germany. The Polabian name of Bergen is Tjörska (spelled Tÿörska in older German reference material), probably derived from tjöra (< Slavic *goră) ‘mountain’.

Bergen an der Dumme lies in the southwestern part of the Wendland region. It is located south of the Drawehn on the southeastern edge of the Elbufer-Drawehn Nature Park. The Wustrow Dumme, western tributary of the River Jeetzel, flows through it.

References

Further reading 
Johann Parum Schultze; Reinhold Olesch (Hrsg.): Fontes linguae Dravaenopolabicae minores et Chronica Venedica J. P. Schultzii. (= Slavistische Forschungen; Band 7). Böhlau, Köln und Graz 1967
Christian Hennig von Jessen: Vocabularium Venedicum (oder Wendisches Wörter-Buch) (1705). Nachdruck besorgt von Reinhold Olesch. - Köln [u.a.]: Böhlau 1959 (Gewährsmann des Pastors C. Hennig von Jessen war der polabisch sprechende Bauer Johann Janieschge aus Klennow)

Lüchow-Dannenberg